Starokucherganovka is a rural locality (a selo) and the administrative center of Starokucherganovsky Selsoviet, Narimanovsky District, Astrakhan Oblast, Russia. The population was 6,042 as of 2010. There are 91 streets.

Geography 
Starokucherganovka is located 47 km south of Narimanov (the district's administrative centre) by road. Bishtyubinka is the nearest rural locality.

References 

Rural localities in Narimanovsky District